The Technical College of the Lowcountry (TCL) is a public community college in Beaufort, South Carolina, that serves the Lowcountry region of South Carolina.

Campuses
The main campus is located in Beaufort along Ribaut Road. Additional facilities are in the New River area (between Bluffton and Hardeeville, Hampton, Parris Island, and at the Marine Corps Air Station in Beaufort. The college offers 75 programs of study.

History
TCL traces its roots to the private Mather School, established in 1868 by Rachel Crane Mather to provide education for children of newly freed slaves in Beaufort County, South Carolina. In 1967, the trustees of the school voted to transfer operations of the school to the State of South Carolina, which had been aggressively building up a statewide technical college system. The school was renamed the Beaufort Regional Training Center in 1970, then the Beaufort Technical Education Center in 1972, then Beaufort Technical College in 1979. During that time, the institution began to expand to serve populations in Colleton, Hampton, and Jasper counties. TCL achieved its current name in 1988 to better reflect the four-county area to which the institution had grown to serve.

Student body
TCL enrolls approximately 2,600 students, of which approximately 1,600 are considered full-time equivalent students. Nearly one-half of students enrolled are minorities, and 72 percent are female. Nearly 80 percent receiving some degree of financial aid.

References

External links
 Official website

South Carolina Technical College System
Education in Beaufort County, South Carolina
Education in Jasper County, South Carolina
Education in Colleton County, South Carolina
Education in Hampton County, South Carolina
Buildings and structures in Beaufort, South Carolina